San Antonio Aguas Calientes is a municipality in the Guatemalan department of Sacatepéquez.

The municipal seat is the town of San Andrés Ceballos which is known for its weavers. Maya women in the area use a backstrap loom to weave traditional patterns. There is a two-story market on the square that sells weavings and other crafts. Several of the women have their looms set up and will demonstrate their skills. There are a couple other stores outside of town that also sell weavings.

References

Municipalities of the Sacatepéquez Department